Kudahuvadhoo Kandu is the channel in between Kolhumadulu, Meemu Atoll and Dhaalu Atoll of the Maldives.

References

 Divehiraajjege Jōgrafīge Vanavaru. Muhammadu Ibrahim Lutfee. G.Sōsanī.

Channels of the Maldives
Channels of the Indian Ocean